Verdiales are a Flamenco music style, and song form belonging to cante chico. 

Originating in Almogía, near the Spanish port of Málaga in Andalucía, it is based upon the fandango. For this reason, the verdiales are sometimes known as fandangos de Málaga.

Normally played in the key of E phrygian (key of C major with a sharpened fifth) and rarely in A minor, the verdiales have a 12-count rhythm similar to the soleares, and bulerías.

(2:18, 502Kb). This example shows some of the more common falsetas you are likely to hear at an informal flamenco performance.

External links
Get to know the flamenco forms: verdiales
verdiales site

Flamenco styles